Scissurella is a genus of minute sea snails, marine gastropod molluscs in the family Scissurellidae, the small slit snails.

Species
According to the World Register of Marine Species (WoRMS), the following species with valid names are included within the genus Scissurella :

 Scissurella alto 
 † Scissurella apudornata Laws, 1935 
 Scissurella azorensis 
 † Scissurella bituminata Beets, 1942 
 Scissurella bountyensis 
 Scissurella cebuana 
 Scissurella clathrata 
 † Scissurella condita Laws, 1939 
 Scissurella costata 
 Scissurella cyprina 
 † Scissurella depontaillieri Cossmann, 1879 
 † Scissurella deshayesi Munier-Chalmas, 1862 
 Scissurella electilis  (taxon inquirendum) 
 Scissurella enriquevidali Fernández-Garcés, Geiger, Rolán & Luque, 2021
 Scissurella evaensis 
 Scissurella georgica 
 Scissurella jucunda 
 Scissurella kaiserae 
 Scissurella lobini 
 Scissurella lorenzi 
 Scissurella manawatawhia 
 Scissurella maraisorum 
 Scissurella mirifica 
 Scissurella morretesi 
 † Scissurella nesbittae Geiger & Goedert, 2020 
 † Scissurella novozeelandica (Bandel, 1998) 
 Scissurella obliqua 
 Scissurella ornata 
 Scissurella petermannensis 
 Scissurella phenax 
 Scissurella prendrevillei 
 Scissurella quadrata 
 Scissurella redferni 
 Scissurella regalis 
 Scissurella reticulata 
 Scissurella rota 
 Scissurella skeneoides 
 Scissurella spinosa 
 Scissurella staminea 
 Scissurella sudanica 
 Scissurella supraplicata 
 † Scissurella transylvanica Reuss, 1860 
 Scissurella xandaros 

Species in the genus Scissurella include:
 Scissurella caliana 
 Scissurella lacuniformis 
 Scissurella lamellata 
 Scissurella soyoae 

Nomina dubia
 Scissurella alexandrei 
 Scissurella coronata 
 Scissurella dalli 
 Scissurella dohrniana 
 Scissurella hoernesi  (synonym of Sinezona ferriezi )
 Scissurella koeneni 
 Scissurella mantelli 
 Scissurella minuta 

Species brought into synonymy
 Scissurella aedonia : synonym of Anatoma aedonia 
 Scissurella aetheria : synonym of Anatoma aetheria 
 † Scissurella affinis O. G. Costa, 1861 : synonym of Anatoma aspera (Philippi, 1844)
 Scissurella africana : synonym of Anatoma africana 
 Scissurella agulhasensis : synonym of Anatoma agulhasensis 
 Scissurella alta : synonym of Anatoma alta 
 Scissurella amoena : synonym of Anatoma amoena 
 Scissurella angulata : synonym of Anatoma crispata 
 Scissurella argutecostata : synonym of Anatoma tenuisculpta 
 Scissurella aspera : synonym of Anatoma aspera 
 Scissurella atkinsoni : synonym of Sukashitrochus atkinsoni 
 Scissurella australis : synonym of Anatoma australis 
 Scissurella bertheloti : synonym of Anatoma bertheloti  (nomen dubium)
 Scissurella cancellata : synonym of Scissurella costata 
 Scissurella carinata : synonym of Sukashitrochus carinatus 
 Scissurella chiricova : synonym of Anatoma chiricova 
 Scissurella cingulata  - belt scissurelle: synonym of Sinezona cingulata 
 Scissurella columbiana : synonym of Sinezona confusa 
 Scissurella concinna : synonym of Sinezona concinna  (nomen dubium)
 Scissurella conica : synonym of Anatoma conica 
 Scissurella crispata : synonym of Anatoma crispata 
 Scissurella decipiens : synonym of Scissurella costata 
 Scissurella declinans : synonym of Scissurella mirifica 
 † Scissurella decussata : synonym of Scissurella costata 
 Scissurella disciformis : synonym of Anatoma disciformis 
 Scissurella dorbignyii : synonym of Sukashitrochus dorbignyi 
 Scissurella dorbignyi : synonym of Scissurella costata 
 Scissurella elatior : synonym of Anatoma crispata 
 Scissurella elegans : synonym of Scissurella costata 
 Scissurella epicharis : synonym of Anatoma keenae 
 Scissurella equatoria : synonym of Anatoma equatoria 
 Scissurella eucharista : synonym of Scissurella clathrata 
 Scissurella euglypta : synonym of Anatoma euglypta 
 Scissurella eximia : synonym of Anatoma eximia )
 Scissurella exquisita : synonym of Anatoma exquisita 
 Scissurella fairchildi : synonym of Scissurella prendrevillei 
 Scissurella funnazzensis : synonym of Anatoma tenuisculpta 
 † Scissurella geoffreyi Laws, 1940: synonym of Incisura geoffreyi (Laws, 1940)  (original combination)
 Scissurella jacksoni : synonym of Anatoma jacksoni 
 Scissurella josephinae : synonym of Anatoma josephinae 
 Scissurella jucunda E. A. Smith, 1910: synonym of Scissurella jucunda E. A. Smith, 1890 (invalid: junior homonym of Scissurella jucunda E. A. Smith, 1890; S. smithi is a replacement name)
 Scissurella keenae : synonym of Anatoma keenae 
 Scissurella kelseyi : synonym of Thieleella kelseyi 
 Scissurella laevigata : synonym of Scissurella costata 
 Scissurella lyra  - lyre scissurelle: synonym of Anatoma lyra 
 Scissurella lyttleltonensis : synonym of Incisura lytteltonensis 
 Scissurella malvinarum : synonym of Scissurella clathrata 
 Scissurella marshalli : synonym of Scissurella prendrevillei 
 Scissurella maxima : synonym of Anatoma maxima 
 Scissurella medioplicata : synonym of Scissurella petermannensis 
 Scissurella miranda : synonym of Sukashitrochus mirandus 
 Scissurella modesta : synonym of Sinezona modesta 
 Scissurella munieri : synonym of Anatoma munieri 
 Scissurella obtusata : synonym of Anatoma obtusata 
 Scissurella padangensis : synonym of Sinezona ferriezi 
 Scissurella palaeomphaloides : synonym of Anatoma crispata 
 Scissurella paumotuensis : synonym of Sinezona paumotuensis 
 Scissurella plicata : synonym of Scissurella costata 
 † Scissurella praecrispata Gougerot & Le Renard, 1978: synonym of † Praescissurella praecrispata (Gougerot & Le Renard, 1977)  (superseded combination)
 Scissurella proxima  - Florida scissurelle: synonym of Anatoma proxima 
 Scissurella pseudoequatoria : synonym of Anatoma pseudoequatoria 
 Scissurella regia : synonym of Anatoma regia 
 Scissurella richardi : synonym of Anatoma tenuis 
 Scissurella rimuloides : synonym of Sinezona rimuloides 
 Scissurella rosea : synonym of Incisura rosea 
 Scissurella sagamiana : synonym of Thieleella sagamiana 
 Scissurella smithi : synonym of Scissurella jucunda 
 Scissurella stellae : synonym of Scissurella prendrevillei 
 Scissurella striatula : synonym of Scissurella costata 
 † Scissurella subaspera : synonym of Anatoma tenuisculpta 
 Scissurella tabulata : synonym of Anatoma tabulata 
 Scissurella tenuis : synonym of Anatoma tenuis 
 Scissurella tenuisculpta : synonym of Anatoma tenuisculpta 
 Scissurella timora : synonym of Scissurella petermannensis 
 Scissurella umbilicata : synonym of Anatoma umbilicata

References

 
 Powell A W B, New Zealand Mollusca, William Collins Publishers Ltd, Auckland, New Zealand 1979 
 Lozouet P. (1998). Nouvelles espèces de gastéropodes (Mollusca: Gastropoda) de l'Oligocène et du Miocène inférieur de l'Aquitaine (Sud-Ouest de la France). Cossmanniana. 5(3-4): 61-102.
 Bandel K. (1998) Scissurellidae als Modell für die Variationsbreite einer natürlichen Einheit der Schlitzbandschnecken (Mollusca, Archaeogastropoda). Mitteilungen des Geologisch-Paläontologischen Instituts der Universität Hamburg, 81: 1–120
 Geiger D. L. (2003) Phylogenetic assessment of characters proposed for the generic classification of Recent Scissurellidae (Gastropoda: Vetigastropoda) with a description of one new genus and six new species frop Easter Island and Australia. Molluscan Research 23: 21–83
 Geiger D. L. (2012) Monograph of the little slit shells. Volume 1. Introduction, Scissurellidae. pp. 1–728. Volume 2. Anatomidae, Larocheidae, Depressizonidae, Sutilizonidae, Temnocinclidae. pp. 729–1291. Santa Barbara Museum of Natural History Monographs Number 7.

External links
 Orbigny, A. D. d'. (1824). Monographie d'un nouveau genre de mollusque gastéropode de la famille des trochoides. Mémoires de la Société d'Histoire Naturelle de Paris. 2 (1): 340-345
 Crosse, H. & Fischer, P. (1861). Observations sur le genre Pleurotomaire, et description d'une deuxième espèce vivante appartenant au même genre. Journal de Conchyliologie. 9: 155-167
 Munier-Chalmas, E. (1862). Description d'une nouvelle Scissurelle, suivie d'une liste monographique des espèces de ce genre. Journal de Conchyliologie. 10(4): 391-397, pl. 16 figs 1-4
 Marshall, B. A. (2002). Some recent scissurellids from the New Zealand region and remarks on some scissurellid genus group names (Mollusca: Gastropoda: Vetigastropoda). Molluscan Research. 22(2): 165-181

Scissurellidae